Choi Chi-won (Korean: 최치원; born 1 June 1993 in South Korea) is a South Korean footballer.

Career

On the final day of the 2015 K-League Challenge, Choi started against Gangwon with Seoul E-Land. In the 36th minute, he went up for a header with Han Seok-jong, but they collided, causing his skull to be fractured. After his recovery, Choi wore headgear to prevent injuries and provide psychological assistance. In 2017, he stopped wearing it to confront his fears.

References

External links

 Choi Chi-won at Soccerway

South Korean footballers
Living people
Association football midfielders
1993 births
Seoul E-Land FC players
Gangwon FC players
Hwaseong FC players